Gregory Ruth (born August 9, 1939) is an American wrestler. He competed in the men's freestyle lightweight at the 1964 Summer Olympics.

References

1939 births
Living people
American male sport wrestlers
Olympic wrestlers of the United States
Wrestlers at the 1964 Summer Olympics
Sportspeople from Bethlehem, Pennsylvania
Pan American Games medalists in wrestling
Pan American Games gold medalists for the United States
Wrestlers at the 1963 Pan American Games
20th-century American people
21st-century American people